The 2009 Kuomintang chairmanship election was held on 26 July 2009 in Taiwan with Ma Ying-jeou as the sole candidate. This was the fourth direct election of the chairman in the Kuomintang (KMT) history. All registered, due-paying KMT party members were eligible to vote.

Aftermath
In his victory speech, Ma promised to enhance cooperation between Kuomintang and the government, deal with party assets and continue efforts to communicate with the opposition Pan-Green Coalition parties. He wished for the KMT to become a party of integrity, democracy and effectiveness. He would be inaugurated as the chairman on the upcoming party congress scheduled on 12 September 2009.

See also
 Elections in Taiwan
 List of leaders of the Kuomintang

References

2009 elections in Taiwan
July 2009 events in Asia
2009
Kuomintang chairmanship election
Single-candidate elections